Rates and causes of deforestation vary from region to region around the world. In 2009, two-thirds of the world's forests were located in just 10 countries: Russia, Brazil, Canada, The United States, China, Australia, The Democratic Republic of the Congo, Indonesia, India, and Peru.

Global annual deforestation is estimated at 13.7 million hectares a year, equal to the area of Greece. Half of this area consists of new forests or forest growth. In addition to direct human-induced deforestation, growing forests have also been affected by climate change. The Kyoto protocol includes an agreement to prevent deforestation, but does not stipulate actions to fulfill it.

Global analysis
An analysis of global deforestation patterns in 2021 showed that patterns of trade, production, and consumption drive deforestation rates in complex ways. While the location of deforestation can be mapped, it does not always match where the commodity is consumed. For example, consumption patterns in G7 countries are estimated to cause an average loss of 3.9 trees per person per year. In other words, deforestation can be directly related to imports—for example, coffee.

Africa
By 2008, Africa was estimated to be suffering deforestation at twice the world average rate, according to the United Nations Environment Programme (UNEP). Some sources claim that deforestation has already wiped out roughly 90% of West Africa's original forests. Today, deforestation is accelerating in Central Africa. According to the United Nations' Food and Agriculture Organization (FAO), Africa lost the highest percentage of tropical forests of any continent during the 1980s, 1990s, and early 2000s. According to the figures from the FAO (1997), only 22.8% of West Africa's moist forests remain, much of them degraded. Nigeria has lost 81% of its old-growth forests in just 15 years (1990–2005).

Mass deforestation threatens food security in some African countries. One factor contributing to the continent's high deforestation rates is the dependence of 90% of its population on wood as fuel for heating and cooking. Research carried out by the World Wide Fund for Nature (WWF) in 2006 shows that rates of illegal logging in Africa vary from 50% in Cameroon and Equatorial Guinea to 70% in Gabon and 80% in Liberia, where timber revenues played a major role in financing the Sierra Leone Civil War and other regional armed conflicts until the UN Security Council imposed a ban on all Liberian timber in 2003.

The Democratic Republic of the Congo 

Deforestation in the Democratic Republic of the Congo has been caused partly by unregulated logging and mining, but mostly by the demands made by the subsistence activities of a poor population. In the east of the country, for example, more than 3 million people live less than a day's walk from Virunga National Park. Wood from the park's forests is used by many of those people as firewood, lumber for construction, and for the production of charcoal. Deforestation caused by subsistence farming is an acute threat to the park in general, and the habitat of the critically endangered mountain gorilla in particular. From 2014 to 2018, the rate of tree-felling in the Democratic Republic of Congo doubled.

Ethiopia 

The main cause of deforestation in the East African country of Ethiopia is a growing population and subsequent higher demand for agriculture, livestock production, and biofuel. Other reasons include low education and inactivity from the government, although the current government has taken some steps to tackle deforestation. Organizations such as Farm Africa are working with the federal and local governments to create a system of forest management. Ethiopia, the third largest country in Africa by population, has been hit by famine many times because of shortages of rain and depletion of natural resources. Deforestation has lowered the chance of getting rain, which is already low, and increased erosion. Berkeley Bayisa, an Ethiopian farmer, offers one example of why deforestation occurs in his observation that his district was once forested and full of wildlife, but that overpopulation caused people to come and clear it to plant crops, cutting all trees to sell as firewood.

Ethiopia has lost 98% of its forested regions in the last 50 years. Recent reports indicate that forests now cover less than 14.2% or even only 11.9% .

Kenya 

In 1963, Kenya had a forest cover of some 10 percent; by 2006, it had only 1.7 percent.

Madagascar 

Deforestation, with resulting desertification, water resource degradation , and soil loss has affected approximately 94% of Madagascar's previously biologically productive lands. Since the arrival of humans 2000 years ago, Madagascar has lost more than 90% of its original forest. Most of this loss has occurred since independence from the French and is the result of local people using slash-and-burn agricultural practices as they try to subsist.

Nigeria 

According to the FAO, Nigeria has the world's highest deforestation rate of primary forests. It has lost more than half of its primary forest in the last five years. The causes cited are logging, subsistence agriculture, and the collection of fuelwood. Almost 90% of West Africa's rainforest has been destroyed.

Asia

East Asia

Japan 
Yoichi Kuroda sketches a history and current outline of 'large scale land and landscape destruction' here. See also Mudslides and Erosion.

North Asia

Russia 

Russia has the largest area of forests of any country on Earth, with around 12 million km2 of boreal forest, larger than the Amazon rainforest. Russia's forests contain 55% of the world's conifers and represent 11% of biomass on Earth. It is estimated that  are deforested each year. Areas nearer to China are most affected, as it is the main source for timber. Deforestation in Russia is particularly damaging as the forests have a short growing season due to extremely cold winters and therefore take longer to recover.

South Asia

India

Sri Lanka

Southeast Asia 

Forest loss is acute in Southeast Asia, the second of the world's great biodiversity hot spots. According to a 2005 report conducted by the FAO, Vietnam has the second highest rate of deforestation of primary forests in the world, second to only Nigeria. More than 90% of the old-growth rainforests of the Philippine Archipelago have been cut. Other Southeast Asian countries where major deforestation is ongoing are Cambodia and Laos. According to a documentary by TelePool, deforestation is being directed by corrupt military personnel and the government (forestry services).

Cambodia

Indonesia 

, at present rates, rainforests in Indonesia would be logged out in 10 years, Papua New Guinea in 13 to 16 years.

Indonesia had lost over 72% of intact forests and 40% of all forests completely in 2005. Illegal logging took place in 37 out of 41 national parks. Illegal logging costs up to US$4 billion a year. The lowland forests of Sumatra and Borneo were at risk of being wiped out by 2022. According to Transparency International, numerous controversial court decisions in this area have raised concerns about the integrity of the judiciary.

Malaysia

Philippines

Thailand

Vietnam

Europe

Europe has lost more than half of its forests in the past 6,000 years. This has primarily been due to agricultural expansion and demand for wood fuel. According to satellite data, the loss of biomass in EU’s forests increased by 69% in the period from 2016 to 2018, compared with the period from 2011 to 2015.

Finland

Iceland
Iceland has undergone extensive deforestation since Scandinavians settled in the ninth century. At the time of human settlement about 1150 years ago, birch forest and woodland covered 'at least 25%' of Iceland's land area. The settlers began by cutting down the forests and burning Shrubland to create fields and grazing land. Deforestation did not end in Iceland until the middle of the 20th century. Afforestation and revegetation have restored small areas of land. However, agriculture was the main reason birch forests and woodland did not grow back.

Italy
Sicily is an oft-cited example of man-made deforestation, practised since Roman times when the island was made into an agricultural region, and continued to this day. This gradually modified the climate, leading to a decline in rainfall and the drying of rivers. Today, the entire central and southwest provinces are practically without any forests. This has also affected Sicily's wild fauna, of which little is left in the island's pastures and crop fields.

Netherlands

The Netherlands, once home to forests and marshes, has been turned into a fertile breadbasket. The remaining forests and marshes are strictly regulated by staatsbosbeheer (or in English: state forest management)  and crisscrossed by service roads and cycling paths. but They are also protected by the Dutch government. with the government taking action with many national parks and protected regions.

Russia

United Kingdom
Nearly all forests in the UK have been turned into pasture over the centuries. A bucolic, rolling landscape has replaced the idea of true forests in the minds of most Britons.

North America

Caribbean

Haiti

Central America 

The history of most Central American countries involves cycles of deforestation and reforestation.  By the fifteenth century, intensive Mayan agriculture had significantly thinned the forests.  Before Europeans arrived, forests covered 500,000 square kilometers – approximately 90% of the region.  Eventually, the forcing of "Europe's money economy on Latin America" created the demand for the exportation of primary products, which introduced the need for large amounts of cleared agricultural land to produce those products. Since the 1960s, cattle ranching has become the primary reason for land clearing.  The lean grass-fed cattle produced by Central American ranches (as opposed to grain-fed cattle raised elsewhere) was perfectly suited for American fast-food restaurants and this seemingly bottomless market has created the so-called "hamburger connection" which links "consumer lifestyles in North America with deforestation in Central America".

Northern America

Canada 

In 2005, an estimated 56,000 hectares were deforested in Canada. Deforestation affected less than 0.02% of Canada’s forests in 2005. The agricultural sector accounted for just over half of the deforestation in 2005, the result of forests having been cleared for pasture or crops. The remainder was caused by urban development, transportation corridors, and recreation (19%); hydroelectric development (10%); the forest sector (10%); and other natural resource extraction industries (8%). About two thirds of this deforestation occurred in Canada’s boreal forest, mainly in Alberta, Saskatchewan, and Manitoba where the forest borders the Prairies.

In Canada, prior to 2000, less than 8% of the boreal forest was protected from development and more than 50% has been allocated to logging companies for cutting.

British Columbia

United States 

For the next 300 years land was cleared, mostly for agriculture, at a rate that matched the rate of population growth. For every person added to the population, one to two hectares of land was cultivated. This trend continued until the 1920s when the amount of crop land stabilized in spite of continued population growth. Since 1963 there has been a steady decrease of forest area with the exception of some gains from 1997.

Oceania

Australia

Due to relatively recent colonisation, Australia has had high rates of deforestation, primarily due to clearing for agricultural purposes.  In recent years much of the clearing has occurred in Tasmania and Queensland. In 2007, rates were expected to decrease with the implementation of new legislation. In 1998, deforestation is thought to have been responsible for around 12% of Australia's total carbon emissions.

An additional factor currently causing the loss of forest cover is the expansion of urban areas. Littoral rainforest growing along coastal areas of eastern Australia is now rare due to ribbon development to accommodate the demand for seachange lifestyles.

Vast amounts of logging continue in Australia despite the devastation of the Black Summer Bushfires in 2019–2020.

New Zealand

In the 800 years of human occupation of New Zealand 75% of the forests were lost. Initially it was by wholesale burning by the British but remaining forests were logged for lumber for the burgeoning population. By 2000 all logging of native trees on public land was stopped. Logging on private land is controlled with a permit system and with the Resource Management Act.

Papua New Guinea

Papua New Guinea (PNG) has one of the world’s largest rainforests. Illegal logging was among highest in the world in 2007, estimated as ca 70-90% of all timber export.

South America

Amazon Rainforest

Brazil

There is no agreement on what drives deforestation in Brazil, though a broad consensus exists that expansion of croplands and pastures is important. Increases in commodity prices may increase the rate of deforestation. Recent development of a new variety of soybean has led to the displacement of beef ranches and farms of other crops, which, in turn, move farther into the forest. Certain areas such as the Atlantic Rainforest have been diminished to just 7% of their original size. Although much conservation work has been done, few national parks or reserves are efficiently enforced. Some 80% of logging in the Amazon is illegal.

In 2008, Brazil's government announced a record rate of deforestation in the Amazon. Deforestation jumped by 69% in 2008 compared to 2007's twelve
months, according to official government data. Deforestation could wipe out or severely damage nearly 60% of the Amazon rainforest by 2030, according to a 2007 report from WWF.

Chile
Despite modern views of Atacama Desert as fully devoid of vegetation in pre-Hispanic and Colonial times a large flatland area known as Pampa del Tamarugal was forested, with demand of firewood associated silver and saltpeter mining causing widespread deforestation. While Tarapacá was still part of Peru demand of firewood by salpeter processing using the paradas method led to widespread deforestation around La Tirana and Canchones plus some areas to the south of these localities. Reforestation efforts in Pampa del Tamarugal begun in 1963 and since 1987 reforestated areas are protected in the Pampa del Tamarugal National Reserve.

Colombia

Peru

See also
 Indian Council of Forestry Research and Education
 List of conservation issues
 List of environmental issues
 Reducing emissions from deforestation and forest degradation (REDD)

References

Further reading

External links
 Encyclopedia of Earth: Deforestation in Amazonia
 Amazon deforestation (Google maps)